Adriana Rendón (born 16 September 1971 in Bello, Antioquia) is a Colombian sport shooter. She tied for 11th place in the women's 10 metre air pistol event and placed 32nd in the women's 25 metre pistol event at the 2000 Summer Olympics.

References

1971 births
Living people
Colombian female sport shooters
Olympic shooters of Colombia
Shooters at the 2000 Summer Olympics
Sportspeople from Antioquia Department
20th-century Colombian women
21st-century Colombian women
South American Games silver medalists for Colombia
South American Games medalists in shooting
Competitors at the 2006 South American Games